Margit Csillik (18 November 1914 – 21 October 2007) was a Hungarian gymnast who competed in the 1936 Summer Olympics.

References

1914 births
2007 deaths
Hungarian female artistic gymnasts
Olympic gymnasts of Hungary
Gymnasts at the 1936 Summer Olympics
Olympic bronze medalists for Hungary
Olympic medalists in gymnastics
Medalists at the 1936 Summer Olympics
20th-century Hungarian women
21st-century Hungarian women